Angelina Nikolayevna Yushkova (born November 13, 1979) is a Russian gymnast. She competed at the 1996 Summer Olympics in Atlanta where she received a bronze medal in the rhythmic group competition.

References
  sports-reference.com

1979 births
Living people
Russian rhythmic gymnasts
Gymnasts at the 1996 Summer Olympics
Olympic gymnasts of Russia
Olympic bronze medalists for Russia
Olympic medalists in gymnastics
Medalists at the 1996 Summer Olympics
20th-century Russian women